Hans Frederiksen (26 February 1905 – 18 November 1988) was a Danish wrestler. He competed in the men's Greco-Roman middleweight at the 1936 Summer Olympics.

References

External links
 

1905 births
1988 deaths
Danish male sport wrestlers
Olympic wrestlers of Denmark
Wrestlers at the 1936 Summer Olympics
People from Lolland Municipality
Sportspeople from Region Zealand
20th-century Danish people